Kaia Jordan Gerber (born September 3, 2001) is an American model. She is the daughter of model Cindy Crawford and businessman Rande Gerber. After starring in a series of ad campaigns for fashion brands since debuting at Fashion Week in 2017, Gerber won Model of the Year at the British Fashion Awards. Gerber and her mother have worked together in campaigns for the Omega watch brand. Gerber is the first model born in the 2000s to achieve The Big Four of Vogue covers.

Early life 
Kaia Jordan Gerber was born on September 3, 2001, in Los Angeles, California. She is the younger of two children born to supermodel Cindy Crawford and businessman Rande Gerber. She has an older brother, Presley (b. 1999), who is also a model.

Her father is of Russian Jewish descent. Her mother, who is of German, English, French, and Danish ancestry, is a Christian. In a 2018 interview, she stated "my dad is Jewish and my mom is Christian so we grew up doing both; we call it Christmas Chrismukah. I love learning about both of those sides of my life. We’d do Passover, Passover dinner and Yom Kippur. I love learning all of that, and learning the cooking."

When she was 10, Gerber landed her first modeling gig with Versace's junior line, Young Versace. Gerber took online classes at Malibu High School.

Career

Gerber made her acting debut at 15 in Sister Cities as the young version of Carolina. Gerber made her runway debut for Raf Simons's Calvin Klein Collection at 16 years old in 2017, and then walked for fashion houses such as Marc Jacobs, Burberry, Alexander Wang, Coach, Prada, Chanel, Fendi, Miu Miu, Max Mara, Givenchy, Bottega Veneta, Stella McCartney, Isabel Marrant, Alberta Ferretti, Loewe, Chloé, Sacai, Michael Kors, Moncler, JW. Anderson, Longchamp, Tom Ford, Salvatore Ferragamo, Ports1961, Lanvin, Anna Sui, Moschino, Saint Laurent, Alexander McQueen, Valentino, and Versace, alongside her mother, during 2018 Spring Fashion Week.

Gerber has made editorials and has been on the cover of fashion magazines, including The Love Magazine, i-D, Teen Vogue and Pop Magazine, etc. as well as different covers and international editions of Vogue, including Vogue Paris, Vogue Japan, Vogue Italia, Vogue British, Vogue India, Vogue China, Vogue Magazine,  and "The Book edition" for Vogue Netherlands with her mother in Winter 2016.

Gerber appeared in the Miu Miu eyewear campaign in 2016, and the Omega campaign in 2017. with her mother, photographed by Peter Lindbergh. In Spring 2018, she appeared in campaigns for Versace, Calvin Klein, and Saint Laurent fall/winter. In 2018, she and Sofia Mechetner led the campaign for Marc Jacobs's fragrance Daisy. In the same year, she was the star of the Chanel spring handbags campaign photographed by Karl Lagerfeld. and Valentino at the same time.

In 2018, Gerber collaborated with Karl Lagerfeld to create the KarlxKaia collection, her first collection. In 2019, Gerber starred in Jimmy Choo's spring/summer and fall/winter campaigns, the Stella McCartney spring campaign and the Fendi spring campaign.She also debuted as the new face of advertising campaigns and brand ambassador for YSL beauty. In 2020, Gerber starred in the Louis Vuitton "Twist bag" spring summer advertising campaign photographed by Craig McDean.

On August 14, 2020, Daily Front Row listed Gerber as one of a group of high-profile investors who purchased W magazine, a fashion magazine. Gerber appeared in the tenth season of the FX horror anthology American Horror Story, as well as its spinoff, American Horror Stories. In 2021, Gerber appeared on her first American Vogue cover, featuring on their June/July issue, and again on their September issue. In 2022, she was cast to recur in the Apple TV+ miniseries Mrs. American Pie.

Personal life
Gerber resides in New York City. She dated American comedian Pete Davidson from late 2019 till February 2020. In October 2020, she began a relationship with Australian actor Jacob Elordi. The couple broke up after a year. In December 2021, she began dating actor Austin Butler.

Awards and honors

Filmography

References

External links 

 
 
 
 

2001 births
Living people
American child actresses
American child models
21st-century American actresses
Female models from California
American film actresses
American people of English descent
American people of French descent
American people of German descent
American people of Jewish descent
American fashion designers
Jewish female models
American women fashion designers